The 2016 Mackay Cutters season was the ninth in the club's history. Coached by David Simpson and captained by Brenden Treston, they competed in the QRL's Intrust Super Cup.

On 23 June, after just one win from their first 15 games, Simpson resigned and was replaced by Jim Wilson. The Cutters endured one of the worst seasons in their history, winning just four games and finishing last.

Season summary
Following the departure of premiership-winning head coach Kim Williams, his assistant David Simpson was named as the club's head coach for 2016. His reign at the club got off to a disastrous start, as the side won just one of their first 15 games. Sitting in dead last on the ladder, Simpson resigned on 23 June and was replaced by his assistant Jim Wilson, who took the job on an interim basis for the rest of the season.

Under Wilson, the club won three of their final nine games and finished the season in last place, winning their second wooden spoon. One of the few positive stories of the season for the Cutters was the rise of North Queensland Cowboys-contracted  Josh Chudleigh, who on the Courier Mail Medal for Queensland Cup Player of the Year. He was also named the club's Player of the Year at their end of season awards night.

Squad List

2016 squad

Squad movement

Gains

Losses

Fixtures

Regular season

Statistics

Honours

Club
Player of the Year: Josh Chudleigh
Players' Player: Brenden Treston
Rookie of the Year: Andrew Davey
Club Person of the Year: Jim Wilson
Sponsors Player of the Year: Josh Chudleigh

League
Courier Mail Medal: Josh Chudleigh
Hooker of the Year: Josh Chudleigh

References

2016 in Australian rugby league
2016 in rugby league by club
Mackay Cutters